Cundiff is an unincorporated community in Adair County, Kentucky, United States.  Its elevation is 968 feet (295 m).

Previously known as Melson Ridge for a local hill named for the Melson family, Cundiff was likely named for Rester C. Cundiff, postmaster when the post office was opened in 1925.

References

Unincorporated communities in Adair County, Kentucky
Unincorporated communities in Kentucky